The 1st FINA Synchronised Swimming World Trophy was held 2006 in Moscow, Russia. It featured swimmers from 8 nations, swimming in three events: Duet, Team and Free Combination.

Participating nations
8 nations swam at the 2006 Synchro World Trophy:

Results

Final standings

References

FINA Synchronized Swimming World Trophy
2006 in synchronized swimming
2006 in Russian sport
International aquatics competitions hosted by Russia
Synchronised swimming in Russia